Birgit Kronström (23 February 1905 – 23 July 1979) was a Finnish actress and singer.

Career
Birgit Kronström studied singing at the Conservatory and then performing arts at the Svenska Teatern, Helsinki's Swedish-language theater. She appeared in various musicals, plus other songs and musical comedies of the Svenska Teatern in various theaters in Stockholm, Sweden.

Birgit Kronström films were almost invariably musical comedies. The first film role was in Finland, in the 1932 film, Olenko minä tullut haaremiin! (I've joined a harem!) with Joel Rinne and Kaisu Leppänen. This was followed in 1934 by Minä ja ministeri (Me and the Minister), directed by Risto Orkon, also with Joel Rinne. In 1938, again under the direction of Orkon, Kronström appeared in Markan tähden (Movie star of the markka). Uuno Laakso, Kullervo Kalske and Irma Seikkula were the other main co-stars.

After the Second World War, films that Kronström appeared in included, Poretta, Onnellinen ministeri (Happy Minister) and Avioliittoyhtiö (Marriage Company), the last two with actor Tauno Palo. in the 1940s at the end of her film career was in sight. Yet in the 1950s Kronström appeared in two Finnish films. One was a comedy Amor Hoi - where she once again starred with Tauno Palo - and Morsiusseppele (The Bridal Wreath), a no-frills tale of a rural romance. Her last screen role was in the Swedish film Flickan i frack in 1956.
Kronström's best known songs from the screen include Katupoikien laulu (Street Boy's Song), Itke en mä lemmen tähden and Amor hoi.

Birgit's first husband from 1938-1943 was opera singer Bjorn Forsell (1915–1975). Their son, Johnny Forsell was a well-known pop singer in the early 1960s. Kronström's second husband from 1944-1953 was opera singer, actor and vocal teacher Ture Ara.

Discography
Markan tähden / Päin onnen rantaa (Columbia DY 187 • 1938)
Shampanjakuhertelua (Odeon A 228611 • 1942) Tauno Palon kanssa
Pikku Annikki (Odeon A 228645 • 1942)
Hetkinen rakkautta (Odeon A 228660 • 1942) Tauno Palon kanssa
Säg de med en rumba (Columbia DY 379 • 1942)
Itke en lemmen tähden (Columbia DY 385 • 1942)
Katupoikien laulu (Columbia DY 387 • 1942)
Amor hoi (Leijona T 0502 • 1950)

Filmography
 Olenko minä tullut haaremiin! (1932)
 Minä ja ministeri (1934)
 Markan tähden (1938)
 Kyökin puolella (1940)
 Eulalia-täti (1940)
 Poretta eli Keisarin uudet pisteet (1941)
 Onnellinen ministeri (1941)
 Avioliittoyhtiö (1942)
 Hevoshuijari (1943)
 Irmeli, seitsentoistavuotias (1948)
 Katupeilin takana (1949)
 Amor hoi! (1950)
 Morsiusseppele (1954)
 The Girl in Tails (1956)

References
 Birgit Kronström on Finnish Wikipedia

1905 births
1979 deaths
Actresses from Helsinki
People from Uusimaa Province (Grand Duchy of Finland)
Swedish-speaking Finns
Finnish film actresses
20th-century Finnish women singers
20th-century Finnish actresses